Saul Paul Ehrlich Jr. (May 4, 1932 – January 6, 2005) was an American physician and public health administrator. He served as acting Surgeon General of the United States from 1973 to 1977.

Director, Office of International Health, Office of the Secretary of Health, Education and Welfare (1969–1977)
Chairman of Executive Board, World Health Organization (1972)
Acting Surgeon General, United States Public Health Service (1973–77)
Former Deputy Director, Pan American Health Organization (1978–1983)
Founding member of the World Cultural Council (1981).

References

External links
 
 

1932 births
2005 deaths
Surgeons General of the United States
Founding members of the World Cultural Council